Boynton Beach station is a Tri-Rail commuter rail station in Boynton Beach, Florida. It is located off High Ridge Road, north of Gateway Boulevard and west of Interstate 95, on a side street leading from High Ridge Road known as Northwest Commerce Park Drive. It officially opened to service on December 18, 1989, and was remodeled in 2003. Parking is available at this station at the dead end of Northwest Commerce Park Drive, which loops in front of the station and has a bus lane along the loop.

Station layout
The station has two side platforms, as well as a parking lot and bus loop to the west of the southbound platform. Access to the northbound platform is via an overpass above the tracks.

References

External links
South Florida Regional Transportation Authority - Boynton Beach station

Tri-Rail stations in Palm Beach County, Florida
Railway stations in the United States opened in 1989
Boynton Beach, Florida
1989 establishments in Florida